Joseph Rymal (November 17, 1821 – December 15, 1900) was a Canadian farmer and political figure. He represented Wentworth South in the House of Commons of Canada as a Liberal member from 1867 to 1882.

He was born in Barton Township, Upper Canada in 1821, the son of Jacob Rymal. His father was a Reformer in the Legislative Assembly of Upper Canada who supported William Lyon Mackenzie. In 1857 Joseph was elected to represent South Wentworth in the Legislative Assembly of the Province of Canada as a Reformer and continued to represent the riding until Confederation. He opposed Confederation but was elected to represent the riding again in the 1st Canadian Parliament and continued to represent it until 1882.

He died on his farm in Barton Township in 1900 after a short illness.

References 
 
 

1821 births
1900 deaths
Members of the Legislative Assembly of the Province of Canada from Canada West
Liberal Party of Canada MPs
Members of the House of Commons of Canada from Ontario